Oaristes is a genus of planthopper belonging to the family Delphacidae.

Species:

Oaristes distincta 
Oaristes impicta 
Oaristes phragmitis 
Oaristes snelli

References

Delphacidae